Fred Taylor (3 January 1884 – 1948) was an English footballer who played in the Football League for Chelsea, Gainsborough Trinity and Rochdale. He was a reliable right half-back who worked hard and liked to move up the field during attacks. He made one appearance for the Football League XI.

Club career

Taylor started his league career playing for Second Division side Gainsborough Trinity but in 1909 he transferred to Chelsea. He was a member of the Chelsea side that reached the 1915 FA Cup Final. In addition to his 155 league appearances he played in 16 FA Cup games for Chelsea. He transferred to Brentford in June 1919 and was awarded a testimonial by Chelsea in 1920.

Managerial career 
Taylor was manager of Peterborough United for the 1936–37 Midland League season. He also served the club as trainer and groundsman.

References

English footballers
Chelsea F.C. players
1884 births
Association football wing halves
Gainsborough Trinity F.C. players
Brentford F.C. players
English football managers
Peterborough United F.C. managers
English Football League players
Footballers from Rotherham
Date of birth missing
Rotherham Town F.C. (1899) players
Midland Football League players
Kimberworth Old Boys F.C. players
Maidstone United F.C. (1897) players
Rochdale A.F.C. players
Peterborough United F.C. players
English Football League representative players
Southern Football League players
1954 deaths
FA Cup Final players